Plaza Francia may refer to

Plaza Francia, Buenos Aires, Argentina, a public square 
Plaza Intendente Alvear, commonly but mistakenly known as Plaza Francia
Plaza Francia (Caracas), Venezuela, a public space
Plaza Francia (band), later the Plaza Francia Orchestra